Kadrish is a Turkmen village in northern Aleppo Governorate, northwestern Syria.

Traveler Martin Hartmann noted the village as a Turkmen village in late 19th century.

Administratively the village belongs to Nahiya Akhtarin in A'zaz District. Nearby localities include Ziadiyah  to the southeast, and Tat Hims  to the northeast. In the 2004 census, Kadrish had a population of 766.

References

Populated places in Azaz District
Turkmen communities in Syria